Hill was a township in what is now the metropolitan county of West Midlands in England.

The township was situated between Halesowen and Blackheath, and covered an area including Coombeswood, Mucklow Hill and the Halesowen Golf Club.

It was originally associated with the Halesowen parish, a detached part of Shropshire, which was transferred to the jurisdiction of Worcestershire in 1844 by the Counties (Detached Parts) Act 1844.  It became considered a separate civil parish in its own right in 1866.

It became part of Stourbridge poor law union, and Stourbridge rural sanitary district (RSD).  It 1894 it became part of the Halesowen Rural District formed from the Worcestershire parts of the Stourbridge RSD.  In 1919 the parish was abolished to merge with Cakemore to form the parish of Hill and Cakemore.  In 1925 the Halesowen rural district became the Halesowen urban district.

References
https://web.archive.org/web/20071001011511/http://www.visionofbritain.org.uk/relationships.jsp?u_id=10334597
https://web.archive.org/web/20071001032051/http://www.visionofbritain.org.uk/relationships.jsp?u_id=10108767

Areas of the West Midlands (county)